Boston Tea Party is a British family-owned independent café group headquartered at its first café in Park Street, Bristol, which was opened in 1995. The business has 22 cafés, predominantly in South West England. Each location adopts a unique interior design and the company emphasises the ethical sourcing of local produce.

Charity 

In 2011, the company created a partnership with Coffee Kids, a charity that supports coffee farmers and their children.

The company is very active in supporting local charities. Each cafe is active in choosing and supporting charities to support. Teams from Bristol attended Cock and Bull festival in 2018, raising £6,000 for Jamie's Farm, a charity that supports vulnerable inner city children.

The company further support charities by donating 10p from the sale of each coffee to charities local to each cafe.

Sustainability 

The company was the first coffee chain in the world to stop issuing single-use coffee cups on 1 June 2018, in order to impact the global plastic crisis. Customers wishing to have a takeaway coffee must now either bring their own cup, borrow a loan cup from the cafe, use a fully refundable deposit, or buy one. Boston Tea Party now offer reusable bamboo Ecoffee Cups at wholesale price to ensure there are no barriers to customers getting a takeaway coffee.

The cost saved from the use of paper cups – 10p per cup – is donated to charities local to each cafe.

They have run talks and workshops sharing their learning and practices with other companies wishing to be more sustainable.

All food is ethically sourced from sustainable resources.

Awards 
In 2015, Boston Tea Party won the award for Best Café in Food Magazine and best chain café in Café Life. In the same year it was also nominated for the Society, Large Group and Innovation awards at the Sustainable Restaurant Awards.

Locations 
The company's head office is based in Park Street, Bristol, England.

Current 
There are currently 24 cafés within England.

Barnstaple
Bath – Alfred Street & Kingsmead Square
Birmingham – Corporation Street, Harborne & Edgbaston 
Bristol – Clifton Village, Gloucester Road, Park Street, Stokes Croft & Whiteladies Road
Cheltenham
Chichester
Exeter - Queen Street
Royal Leamington Spa
Taunton - Fore Street, within the former Prezzo building.
Honiton
Plymouth
Ringwood
Salisbury
Solihull
Stratford-upon-Avon
Worcester
Worthing

See also 
List of coffeehouse chains

References

External links 
 

Coffeehouses and cafés in the United Kingdom
British companies established in 1995
Restaurants established in 1995
Companies based in Bristol
1995 establishments in England